Szombathely is a district in central-western part of Vas County. Szombathely is also the name of the town where the district seat is found. The district is located in the Western Transdanubia Statistical Region.

Geography 
Szombathely District borders with Kőszeg District to the north, Sárvár District to the east, Vasvár District and Körmend District to the south, the Austrian state of Burgenland to the west. The number of the inhabited places in Szombathely District is 40.

Municipalities 
The district has 1 urban county, 1 town and 38 villages.
(ordered by population, as of 1 January 2013)

The bolded municipalities are cities.

Demographics

In 2011, it had a population of 112,320 and the population density was 174/km².

Ethnicity
Besides the Hungarian majority, the main minorities are the German (approx. 2,500), Croat (2,000), Roma (850), Romanian (200) and Slovene (150).

Total population (2011 census): 112,320
Ethnic groups (2011 census): Identified themselves: 100,855 persons:
Hungarians: 94,314 (93.52%)
Germans: 2,467 (2.45%)
Croats: 1,997 (1.98%)
Others and indefinable: 2,077 (2.06%)
Approx. 11,500 persons in Szombathely District did not declare their ethnic group at the 2011 census.

Religion
Religious adherence in the county according to 2011 census:

Catholic – 63,800 (Roman Catholic – 63,623; Greek Catholic – 144);
Evangelical – 2,899;
Reformed – 2,158;
other religions – 1,117; 
Non-religious – 8,213; 
Atheism – 1,149;
Undeclared – 32,984.

See also
List of cities and towns in Hungary

References

External links
 Postal codes of the Szombathely District

Districts in Vas County